Bexley Council could refer to:

Bexley City Council, Ohio
Bexley London Borough Council, starting 1965
Bexley Borough Council (municipal borough), England from 1935 to 1965